Calosoma sponsa is a species of ground beetle in the subfamily of Carabinae. It was described by Casey in 1897.

References

sponsa
Beetles described in 1897